Samir Nashar is the spokesman for the Syrian Free National Party, a small opposition party established in 2005. He is also a member of the Committee for Reviving the Civil Society.  He was arrested by Syrian authorities on March 25, 2006 in Aleppo by agents of the military secret service after he returned from a meeting of exiled opposition figures in Washington, D.C. On March 26, the Syrian Human Rights Organisation called for his immediate release. On March 27, he was released from custody.

External links

Khaleej Times

Syrian human rights activists
Living people
Year of birth missing (living people)
National Coalition of Syrian Revolutionary and Opposition Forces members
Syrian dissidents